"Love Don't Live Here" is the debut single recorded by American country music trio Lady Antebellum, released in October 2007 from their self-titled debut album. Although the group had charted along with pop artist Jim Brickman on his 2007 single "Never Alone", this song serves as Lady Antebellum's first release to country radio. It was written by the group's three members (Hillary Scott, Charles Kelley, and Dave Haywood), and features Kelley on lead vocals. The song peaked at #3 on the Billboard Hot Country Songs chart dated for the week of June 14, 2008.

Background
Kelley describes the song as follows: "I really felt like we found our sound on this song, and I was really proud that it   became our first single since it was one of the first songs that the three of us  wrote together." Producer Victoria Shaw had previously worked with the trio as a co-writer of "Never Alone".

In a 2017 interview with Billboard magazine, Kelley revealed that the song  was written after Scott experienced a breakup and Kelley said "Let's write a song about it".

Content
"Love Don't Live Here" is a mid-tempo country-rock arrangement in which Charles Kelley sings lead vocals. Accompanied by electric guitar and mandolin runs, the song finds the narrator addressing a former lover who has shown up at his door. He tells her that, although she is "passing through to claim [her] lost-and-found", he is emphatically unwilling to rekindle their relationship.  While seemingly she had the upper hand and decided to end the previous relationship, it is clear that now, the narrator has the upper hand, as he emotionally and powerfully declares that he is moving on, and she is no longer welcome in his life.

Music video
The song's music video was filmed and released in December 2007. Chris Hicky directed the video.  Rather than portraying the emotionally powerful content of the song's lyrics, the music video simply chronicles the group's preparation and performance of the song in front of an audience at a small venue. In the aforementioned interview with Billboard magazine, Haywood explained that the music video making process took longer than he expected.

Awards
At the 51st Grammy Awards, "Love Don't Live Here" received a nomination for Best Country Performance by a Duo or Group with Vocals. The group itself was nominated for Best New Artist as well.

Credits and personnel
The following musicians perform on this track:
Bruce Bouton – steel guitar
Eric Darken – percussion
Jason "Slim" Gambill – electric guitar
Dave Haywood – acoustic guitar, mandolin, background vocals
Charles Kelley – lead vocals
Rob McNelley – electric guitar
Michael Rojas – Hammond B-3 organ
Hillary Scott – background vocals
Victoria Shaw – background vocals
Brice Williams – drums
Paul Worley – acoustic guitar, electric guitar
Craig Young – bass guitar

Chart performance

Year-end charts

References

2007 songs
2007 debut singles
Lady A songs
Song recordings produced by Paul Worley
Songs written by Hillary Scott
Songs written by Charles Kelley
Songs written by Dave Haywood
Music videos directed by Chris Hicky
Capitol Records Nashville singles